Eunebristis zingarella is a moth in the family Gelechiidae. It was described by Walsingham in 1897. It is found in the West Indies.

The wingspan is about 9 mm. The forewings are ochreous, mottled with brick-red and streaked with steel-blue, with three black dots along the termen. The hindwings are pale grey.

The larvae feed on Coccoloba uvifera. They mine the leaves of their host plant.

References

Moths described in 1897
Dichomeridinae